The 1966 Purdue Boilermakers football team represented the Purdue University in the 1966 Big Ten Conference football season. The Boilermakers, led by future National Football League (NFL) quarterback Bob Griese, won the 1967 Rose Bowl.  Griese led Purdue to a second-place finish in the Big Ten Conference and the school's first appearance in the Rose Bowl Game.  The Boilermakers were the runner-up in the Big Ten behind Michigan State, but received the conference's Rose Bowl berth because of the Big Ten's "no-repeat" rule at the time. Griese was a two-time All-American at Purdue and was the runner-up to Steve Spurrier for the Heisman Trophy in 1966.

Schedule

Roster

Game summaries

Ohio

at Notre Dame

SMU

Iowa

at Michigan

at Michigan State

Illinois

at Wisconsin

at Minnesota

Indiana

Purdue clinches Rose Bowl berth
Bob Griese 11/21, 255 Yds, 3 TD, 1 FG, 6/7 XP
Leroy Keyes Rush TD, Pass TD, INT
Jim Beirne 2 TD Rec
Biggest margin in rivalry since 1893

USC (Rose Bowl)

Team players in the NFL

Awards and honors
Bob Griese, Sammy Baugh Trophy
Bob Griese, second in Heisman Trophy voting

References

Purdue
Purdue Boilermakers football seasons
Rose Bowl champion seasons
Purdue Boilermakers football